Patriot Preparatory Academy is a charter school in Columbus, Ohio. The building was utilized by Liberty Christian Academy/Liberty Preparatory Academy until they moved to a new facility in Pataskala, Ohio in 2010.

Athletics 
Patriot Preparatory participates in athletics under the authority of the Ohio High School Athletic Association.

Sports 
Basketball (Boys, 7th, 8th, JV, and Var.)

Basketball (Girls, MS, JV, and Var.)

Basketball (Intramural, K-6th)

Soccer (Coed, MS and Var.)

Volleyball (Girls, MS, JV, and Var.)

Baseball (Boys, MS and Var.)

Softball (Girls, MS and Var.)

Track and Field (Coed, MS and Var.)

Cheerleading (Girls, MS, JV, and Varsity)

Championships/Honors 
2011- Girls Basketball

2012- Boys Basketball

2017- Hosted first OHSAA Tournament game

Academics 
2016 Average Testing Score: 55.2% (2016)

Student Teacher Ratio: 16:1

Reading Proficiency- 79%

Math Proficiency- 56%

Average ACT Score: 20/36

3 Visual Arts classes:
 General Art
 Theater Arts
 Dance
3 Music classes:
 Band
 Choir
 Instrumental and Theory Music

1 Foreign Language class
 Spanish 
2 Technology Classes
 Information Technology
 Typing
12 School Clubs/Programs
 Art Club
 Creative Writing
 Debate Club
 Drill Team
 Glee Club
 National Honor Society
 Yearbook
 Before/After School Extended Care
 D4G
 Bible Club
 Queen's Talk
 Student Council

External links 

 www.patriotprep.com
 www.greatschools.com
 www.usnews.com

Charter schools in Ohio
Schools in Columbus, Ohio